Hère is French and may refer to:

 Hère (card game), a French card game and predecessor of Coucou
 Hère (wine grape), a variety of wine grape usually known as Gros Verdot